Valery Yakovlevich Levental (17 August 1938 – 8 June 2015) was a Russian theatrical scenic designer. He was named People's Artist of the USSR and was a member-correspondent of the Academy of Art.

He designed many musicals and dramas in Russia and abroad. Between 1988 and 1995, he was the lead artist at Russia's famed Bolshoi Theatre.  Levental was awarded the State Prize of the Russian Federation in 1994.

References

1938 births
2015 deaths
People's Artists of the USSR (visual arts)
Ballet librettists
Theatre people from Moscow
Place of death missing
Russian scenic designers
Bolshoi Theatre
Academic staff of Moscow Art Theatre School